Sid Smith may refer to:

 Sid Smith (ice hockey) (1925–2004), Canadian ice hockey player 
 Sid Smith (lacrosse) (born 1986), Iroquois lacrosse player
 Sid Smith (author), English freelance writer on music
 Sid Smith (writer) (born c. 1949), English novelist and journalist
 Sid Smith (actor) (1894–1928), American actor
 Sid Smith (American football) (born 1948), former American football offensive lineman
 Sid Smith (Australian footballer) (1928–1985), former VFL footballer at Geelong
 Sid Smith (American football coach) (1912–2006), American football coach
 Sid Smith (boxer) (1889–1948), English flyweight boxer
 Sid Smith Sr. (1890–1952), Australian rules footballer

See also
 Syd Smith (disambiguation)
 Sidney Smith (disambiguation)
 Sydney Smith (disambiguation)